Elizabeth Yin Yin Yue is a Singaporean sports sailor. At the 2012 Summer Olympics, she competed in the Women's Laser Radial class, finishing in 24th place.  She also competed in the same event at the 2016 Summer Olympics, finishing in 26th place.  She has also competed in two sailing World Championships (2011, 2014), six Laser Radial World Championships (2008, 2010, 2012, 2013, 2015 and 2016) and two Byte-class World Championships (2005 and 2006).

References

External links
 

Living people
Singaporean sportspeople of Chinese descent
Olympic sailors of Singapore
Singaporean female sailors (sport)
Sailors at the 2012 Summer Olympics – Laser Radial
Victoria Junior College alumni
Sailors at the 2014 Asian Games
Sailors at the 2016 Summer Olympics – Laser Radial
Southeast Asian Games gold medalists for Singapore
Southeast Asian Games medalists in sailing
Year of birth missing (living people)
Competitors at the 2013 Southeast Asian Games
Asian Games competitors for Singapore